The Carlton Football Club has been involved in 29 VFL/AFL Grand Finals from 1897-2006, winning 16 premiership titles.

Notable Grand Finals

1945: The Bloodbath
An infamous battle between Carlton and South Melbourne (now Sydney Swans), in which the game became footbrawl rather than football. It is the most bloodiest and toughest grand final of all time with the reporting and suspension of ten footballers from both teams. Fights went on all day with several players being knocked out, involving umpires, police, trainers, and spectators, all fighting on the field. Princes Park in Melbourne had 63,000 spectators screaming for blood. Carlton won by 28 points with the following ten players being reported: 
    
Ted Whitfield (South), found guilty and suspended for the entire 1946 season.
Jack "Basher" Williams (South), found guilty and suspended for twelve weeks.
Captain Herbie Matthews (South), found guilty and severely reprimanded.
 Keith Smith (South), found not guilty.
 Don Grossman (South), found guilty and suspended for eight weeks.
Jim Cleary (South), found guilty and suspended for eight weeks.
Ken Hands (Carlton), found not guilty.
Captain Bob Chitty (Carlton), found guilty and suspended for eight weeks.
Ron Savage (Carlton), found guilty and suspended for eight weeks.
Fred Fitzgibbon (Carlton), an already suspended player, found guilty and suspended for a further four weeks for running onto the field and joining in numerous brawls.

1970: The Great Comeback
The most famous Grand Final of all time took place in 1970 before a record crowd of 121,000 people at the Melbourne Cricket Ground (MCG) who watched Carlton take on Collingwood. At half-time, the Blues were 44 points behind (nearly 8 goals) and the game seemed all but over, with a victory seeming a certainty for mighty Collingwood. At the half-time break, legendary Carlton coach Ron Barassi blasted his players with a frightening tirade of verbal abuse, pushing and motivating his team to concentrate on handpassing and short kicks - a strategy that worked wonders. In the second half of the game...the tide had turned...and the Blues came storming home. At the time-on stage in the last quarter with the final siren about to go off at any second, the Blues were still two points behind, then suddenly two quick goals - one from  Crosswell and another from Alex Jesaulenko - saw Carlton in front by ten points. The clock was ticking...suddenly...the siren sounded...the game was over...Carlton...had snatched victory from the jaws of defeat. There was nothing...absolutely nothing...but euphoria for the Carltonians...the MCG was shaking...the whole world and the skies were painted Navy Blue.

During the game, the football world was inspired by one of the most famous marks in VFL/AFL history. Towards the end of the second quarter David McKay kicked it to the wing and Jesaulenko soared high into the sky on the shoulders of Collingwood's ruckman Graeme "Jerker" Jenkins, a giant of a man at 6'6", and took the heaven-high-grab with his hands out in front of his face. The commentator, Mike Williamson, spoke the infamous words "McKay, to the wing position on the member's stand side, OH JESAULENKO! YOU BEAUTY!" The mark symbolises Carlton famous victory over Collingwood in this Grand Final.

For 37 years this Grand Final victory stood as the greatest comeback in Carlton's history, until the 2007 season when the record was broken by an impressive win from 48 points down in the Round 3 clash against Essendon. It is fitting that Carlton's two greatest comeback wins are against its two fiercest rivals.

Premiership teams
Source: Graeme Atkinson, "The COURAGE book of VFL Finals 1897 - 1973", Wren Publishing Pty Ltd & Courage Breweries Ltd, 1973. .

(C) = Captain, (NSM) = Norm Smith Medallist.

References

External links
Official Website of the Carlton Football Club
Premierships Page on the Blueseum

Premierships